Olga Makarova is a Soviet sprint canoer who competed in the late 1970s. She won a silver medal in the K-1 500 m event at the 1978 ICF Canoe Sprint World Championships in Belgrade.

References

Living people
Soviet female canoeists
Year of birth missing (living people)
Russian female canoeists
ICF Canoe Sprint World Championships medalists in kayak